Christopher or Chris Whyte may refer to:

Christopher Whyte (born 1952), Scottish writer
Chris Whyte (born 1961), English footballer

See also
Christopher White (disambiguation)
Christopher Wight (born 1959), cricketer from the Cayman Islands